Stand for Something or Die for Nothing is the sixth and final album by the Street Dogs. It was released on June 22, 2018. The album marks the band's first full-length album in eight years and first for the Century Media label. The only album to feature Pete Sosa on drums, Matt Pruitt on lead guitar and Lenny Lashley on rhythm guitar. The album features a guest appearance by Boston hip hop artist and actor, Slaine, on the song "Angels Calling".

Singer Mike McColgan said of the album “The dumbing down of America is a reason to write songs in 2018. The theme is wake the fuck up and the working class needs to unite across all colors, creeds, nationalities, genders and realize that we are being pitted against each other by snake oil salesmen and autocrats. From freedom of speech (“Stand for Something or Die for Nothing”) to living The American Dream (“Working Class Heroes”) to getting back on track (“The Comeback Zone”) – Stand for Something or Die for Nothing raises political awareness and injects optimism into those who have doubts about their future and the current administration

Track listing

Personnel
Mike McColgan – vocals
Johnny Rioux – bass
Pete Sosa – drums
Matt Pruitt – lead guitar
Lenny Lashley – rhythm guitar

Charts

References

Street Dogs albums
2018 albums